The Sierra Madre is the longest mountain range in the Philippines. It is bordered by the Pacific Ocean to the east, Cagayan Valley to the northwest, Central Luzon to the midwest, and Calabarzon to the southwest. Some communities east of the mountain range, along the coast, are less developed and so remote that they could only be accessed by taking a plane or a boat.

The country's largest protected area, the Northern Sierra Madre Natural Park, is situated at the northern part of the range in the province of Isabela. The park is in the UNESCO tentative list for World Heritage List inscription. Environmentalists, scholars, and scientists have been urging the government to include the other parks within the Sierra Madre mountains for a UNESCO site that would encompass the entire mountain range from Cagayan to Quezon.

Geography 
In the north, the range starts in the province of Cagayan and ends in the south in the province of Quezon. In the province of Nueva Vizcaya, the Caraballo Mountains lies between Sierra Madre and Cordillera Central.

The mountain range serves as a typhoon barrier, attenuating incoming typhoons from the Pacific Ocean before reaching the central mainland.

Elevation 

The range's highest point is unclear, and several peaks are attributed as the highest.

Peaks 
List of highest peaks along the mountain range by elevation.

Mount Bintuod - 
 Mount Guiwan – 
 Mount Mingan – 
 Mount Anacuao – 
 Mount Cetaceo – 
 Mount Dos Cuernos – 
 Salakot Peak –  
 Mount Cresta – 
 Mount San Cristobal – 
 Mount Otunao – 
 Mount Irid – 
 Mount Batay – 
 Mount Dos Hermanos – 
 Mount Minalunad –   
 Mount Oriod – 
 Mount Palanan – 
 Mount Cagua – 
 Mount Etnora – 
 Mount Lubog –  
 Mount Sumag – 
 Mount Batolusong  
 Mount Mapalad  
 Mount Daraitan – 
 Mount Maynoba – 
 Mount Masungki – 
 Mount Binutasan – 
 Mount Malauban –

Rivers 
List of major rivers along the mountain range by length.

 Cagayan River 518 km (322 miles)
 Pampanga River 270 km (167.7 miles)
 Ilagan River 189 km (117 miles)
 Angat River 153 km ( 95 miles )
 Agos River 93.8 km ( 58.2 miles )
 Pinacanauan River 82.6 km (51.3 mi)
 Umiray River 80.6 km (50 miles)
 Palanan River 79 km (49 miles)
 Marikina River 78 km (48.2 miles)
 Abuan River 70 km (43.4 miles)
 Aguang River 52 km (32.3 miles)
 Kaliwa River 31.3 km (19.4 miles)

Waterfalls

List of waterfalls in Sierra Madre
Daranak Falls, Tanay
Eva Falls, Dona R. Trinidad
Lucab Falls, Dona R. Trinidad
Secret Falls, Dona R. Trinidad
Talon Pari Falls, Dona R. Trinidad
Talon Pedro Falls, Dona R. Trinidad
13th Falls, Dona R. Trinidad
Verdivia Falls, Dona R. Trinidad
Zamora Falls, Dona R. Trinidad

Ecoregions 

Two ecoregions cover the Sierra Madre. The Luzon rain forests cover the lower slopes of the range, and are characterized by dipterocarp trees. The Luzon montane rain forests cover the portions of the range above 1000 meters elevation, and are characterized by laurel forests of oak and laurel trees.

National parks 
 Aurora Memorial National Park
 Biak-na-Bato National Park
 Fuyot Springs National Park

Other protected areas 
 Amro River Protected Landscape
 Angat Watershed Forest Reserve
 Casecnan Protected Landscape
 Dinadiawan River Protected Landscape
 La Mesa Watershed Reservation
 Magapit Protected Landscape
 Northern Sierra Madre Natural Park
 Pantabangan–Carranglan Watershed Forest Reserve
 Peñablanca Protected Landscape and Seascape
 Quezon Protected Landscape
 Quirino Protected Landscape
 Simbahan-Talagas Protected Landscape
 Talaytay Protected Landscape
 Upper Marikina River Basin Protected Landscape

Active volcanoes 
Cagua Volcano, an active volcano in Cagayan province that last erupted in 1907.

Indigenous and remote communities

Indigenous peoples 
Sierra Madre is home to Indigenous Dumagat-Remontado communities who have ancestral domain claims covering parts of the mountain range.

Remote communities 
Some coastal communities east of the Sierra Madre mountains, especially from Palanan, Isabela heading north to near the northernmost tip of mainland Cagayan, are remote and isolated with no roads connecting them to towns west of the mountain range. Towns like Palanan, Divilacan and Maconacon, Isabela can only be reached by plane from Cauayan or a boat ride from Aurora province, south of Isabela or from Santa Ana, Cagayan, north of the province. Ilagan City – Divilacan road traversing the Sierra Madre mountain is about to be completed.

Biodiversity 
The Sierra Madre mountain range is rich in genetic, species, and habitat diversity, supplying food, water, and shelter to millions of people. The mountain range hosts multiple watersheds and some of the Philippines' oldest forests. These forests are some of the country's largest remaining forest blocks, including an old-growth dipterocarp forest, montane forests, and extensive lowland forests.

Sierra Madre's forests and watersheds are home to some of the country's richest wildlife communities. More than 291 species of birds and 25 endemic mammals may be found within the Northern Sierra Madre Natural Park alone.

Endemic flora and fauna 
Northern Sierra Madre Natural Park, the largest protected area in Sierra Madre range, is home to endemic dipterocarp trees belonging to the Hopea and Shorea genera, orchids such as Dendrobium aclinia, the leguminous tree, Milletia longipes and a member of the citrus family, Swinglea glutinosa as well.

In the forest, in April 2010, the endemic lizard species Northern Sierra Madre Forest monitor lizard – Varanus bitatawa (common name: Butikaw) was described to science, although the Aeta and Ilongot indigenous peoples have known and used it as a food source. The Northern Sierra Madre forest monitor lizard is one of the three frugivorous lizards in the Varanidae family along with V. olivaceus and V. mabitang. All of the three frugivorous lizards are found only in the Philippines.

Endemic mammals in Sierra Madre are the Sierra Madre shrew mouse and Sierra Madre forest mouse.

Non-endemic flora and fauna
Narra, the national tree of the Philippines, Almaciga, and Kamagong can be found on the Sierra Madre range.

Isabela oriole, Philippine eagle, and Philippine crocodile are critically endangered species that can be found in fragmented locations.

Human activities

Forest-loss due to anthropogenic activities
The Sierra Madre mountain range forest habitat is threatened by human activities. Settlers living at the lower portions of the slopes generally are supported by work in logging and charcoal-making. Some portions of the forest cover are already second growth forest. Forest degradation of at least 1,400 hectares per year caused by illegal tree cutting, slash and burn farming, fuel-wood collection, illegal hunting, and residential expansion.

Mining
A gold and copper mine in the municipality of Kasibu, Nueva Vizcaya, has been operated by the OceanaGold Corporation based in Australia. The Didipio mine is a large-scale open-pit mine in a remote location, and local residents claim the company has severely damaged both the environment for miles around the site, and suppressed the long-standing farming economy. Oceana continues to assert a right to operate despite expiration of its permit, and opposition by organized local residents, the Catholic Church, and worldwide environmental groups.

Hydropower project
The Kaliwa dam project through a project called "New  Centennial Water Source" in Sitio Cablao, Brgy. Pagsangahan, General Nakar, Quezon / Sitio Queborosa, Brgy. Magsaysay, Infanta, Quezon is threatening the endangered species living in the sparse remaining forest of Sierra Madre and indigenous people's lives in that area. This project replaced the Kaliwa Low Dam that did not materialize and under the new administration, Rodrigo Duterte approved the Chinese-funded proposal. Aside from the destruction of ecologically important forests, the dam also faces controversy for fulfillment of its financial requirement through a Chinese loan with a 2.0% interest rate rather than a Japanese loan with a 1.25% interest rate. The project continues to face strong opposition from the public yet the government is eager to continue. Construction of Kaliwa dam began in 2022.

Conservation efforts
The Mabuwaya Foundation is a non-governmental organization that aims to protect and conserve the Philippine crocodiles and other endemic threatened species. They mainly works in the towns of Divilican and San Mariano in Isabela.

On June 19, 2012, in light of the onslaught of Tropical Storm Ondoy on September 26, 2009, Philippine president Benigno Aquino III signed Proclamation No. 413, declaring every September 26 as "Save Sierra Madre Day" in an effort to raise awareness on the benefits that the Sierra Madre brings and the risks and dangers of neglecting it. The proclamation also calls "all sectors of society and the government" to join hands in pursuing activities geared toward the conservation of the Sierra Madre, and to plan, prepare, and conduct activities in observance of Save Sierra Madre Day.

See also
Geography of the Philippines
Ecoregions in the Philippines

References

External links

Sierra Madre Biodiversity Corridor

 
Mountain ranges of the Philippines
Landforms of Aurora (province)
Landforms of Cagayan
Landforms of Isabela (province)
Landforms of Quirino
Landforms of Nueva Ecija
Landforms of Bulacan
Landforms of Rizal
Landforms of Laguna (province)
Landforms of Quezon